is the first album and only album of the subgroup Pucchimoni. It was released on August 21, 2002 selling a total of 109,160 copies and placing at #1 on the Oricon charts.

Track listing 
The lyricist and composer of the songs is Tsunku.
 
 
 
 
 
 
 "Dream & Kiss"

Members at the time of release 
 Kei Yasuda
 Maki Goto
 Hitomi Yoshizawa

External links 
 Zenbu! Petitmoni on the Up-Front Works website

2002 albums
Hello! Project albums
Petitmoni albums